John Lawrence Kane Jr. (born February 14, 1937) is an American attorney and jurist, currently serving as a senior United States district judge of the United States District Court for the District of Colorado.

Education and career

Born in Tucumcari, New Mexico, Kane received a Bachelor of Arts degree from the University of Colorado Boulder in 1958 and a Juris Doctor from the Sturm College of Law at the University of Denver in 1960.

Career 
Kane worked as a law clerk for the Seventeenth Judicial District of Colorado from 1960 to 1961, and worked in private practice in Brighton, Colorado from 1961 to 1963. He served as deputy district attorney of the Seventeenth Judicial District of Colorado from 1961 to 1963, returning to private practice in Denver, Colorado in 1964. He was the public defender of Adams County in Brighton, Colorado from 1965 to 1967. He was the Deputy Director of the Peace Corps in the Eastern Region of India in Calcutta (now Kolkata), India from 1967 to 1968, and a Peace Corps Country Representative in Turkey from 1968 to 1969. He was an Instructor at Metropolitan State University of Denver from 1973 to 1974, again in private practice in Denver from 1970 to 1977, and an adjunct professor at Sturm College of Law from 1978 to 1988. He was a visiting lecturer in law at Trinity College in Dublin, Ireland in 1989. He was the Miller Distinguished Visiting Professor of Law at Sturm College of Law from 1990 to 1996, and an adjunct professor at the University of Colorado Law School from 1996 to present.

Federal judicial service 

Kane was nominated by President Jimmy Carter on November 2, 1977, to a seat on the United States District Court for the District of Colorado vacated by Judge Alfred A. Arraj. He was confirmed by the United States Senate on December 15, 1977, and received his commission on December 16, 1977. He assumed senior status due to a certified disability on April 8, 1988. His disability was sleep apnea, brought about by work related stress. Despite being granted early senior status, he has continued to work a reduced, but substantial caseload to the present.

Personal

Kane was interviewed by his daughter as part of StoryCorps on NPR's Morning Edition on October 8, 2010.

References

Sources
 
 Hon. John L. Kane District of Colorado

1937 births
Living people
Judges of the United States District Court for the District of Colorado
People from Tucumcari, New Mexico
Public defenders
Sturm College of Law alumni
United States district court judges appointed by Jimmy Carter
20th-century American judges
University of Colorado Boulder alumni
University of Denver faculty
People from Brighton, Colorado
21st-century American judges